Konza Technopolis, previously called Konza Technology City, is a large technology hub planned by the government of Kenya to be built 64 km south of Nairobi on the way to the port city of Mombasa. It is marketed as a key driver of Kenya's national development plan, known as Kenya Vision 2030. As of January 2019, the project appeared to be far behind schedule.

The plan
Konza Technopolis is a business process outsourcing (BPO) project that is being marketed by the Kenyan government through Kenya ICT Board. It is dubbed "where African silicon savannah begins". According to the Konza information website, the project wants to attract business process outsourcing, software development, data centres, disaster recovery centres, call centres and light assembly manufacturing industries; and build a university campus focused on research and technology as well as hotels, residential areas, schools and hospitals. It is also intended to include a science park, a convention centre, shopping malls, hotels, international schools, and a health facility.

It is estimated to cost 1.2 trillion Kenyan shillings (approx US$14.5bn). It is marketed as a key driver of Kenya's national development plan, known as Kenya Vision 2030.

Design team 

The Ministry of Information and Communications (Kenya) and International Finance Corporation (IFC) engaged Master Delivery Partner 1 (MDP1) to prepare a detailed business plan and master plan for Phase 1 in July 2012. The Expression of Interest for this assignment attracted 22 firm responses, narrowed to 6 in a shortlist. The Ministry and IFC selected the team led by HR&A Advisors, Inc. of New York City leading a 6-firm international team:

HR&A Advisors, Inc.; A real estate and economic development advisory firm specialising in large-scale master plan implementation.
SHoP Architects: An architecture and planning firm creating the conceptual design for the sales pavilion and the urban design for Phase 1.
Dalberg Global Development Advisors: An international strategy consulting firm with a Nairobi presence advising on economic strategy, tenant outreach, and organisational strategy for the KOTDA.
Center for Urban and Regional Planning: A Nairobi-based physical planning firm preparing the Local Physical Development Plan for Konza
OZ Architecture: A design firm providing sustainability strategies for Konza.
Tetra Tech: An international engineering services firm developing the infrastructure concepts for Konza.
Dar Al-Handasah: An International engineering services firm carrying out the Construction supervision services

Development 
Konza Technopolis was allowed by the Parliament Account Committee and endorsed by the Kenyan Government.

The initial feasibility and concept master plan was prepared jointly by Deloitte and Pell Frischmann, a UK based design consultancy and funded by the International Finance Corporation. During the feasibility study, Pell Frischmann proposed a city—Konza Technology City, to make the technology park a more viable destination. The Kenyan government agreed and commissioned a new master plan for a city of  that was completed by Pell Frischmann.

See also
IHub
NaiLab
Silicon Savannah
Kigali Innovation City

References

External links 

Science and technology in Kenya
Machakos County
Planned cities